The Pierce–Borah House is a historic building in Garden City, Idaho. Listed on the National Register of Historic Places, the house was among the earliest designed by prominent Idaho architect John E. Tourtellotte. It was completed in 1897 and originally located at 11th and Franklin Streets, in nearby Boise.

The house was commissioned by Boise entrepreneur Walter E. Pierce but was sold in 1898 to William Borah, later a prominent United States Senator. Pierce had sold another of his houses to Borah in 1893. In 1959, the house was purchased by Vernon K. Smith and moved from its original location to the present site, in a rural area west of downtown Garden City.

Although the house was described as being in "excellent condition" in a 1982 report, it appears to have since fallen into disrepair.

References

Houses on the National Register of Historic Places in Idaho
Houses in Ada County, Idaho
Houses completed in 1897
National Register of Historic Places in Ada County, Idaho